"Civilization" is an American traditional pop song. It was written by Bob Hilliard and Carl Sigman, published in 1947 and later included in the 1947 Broadway musical Angel in the Wings, sung by Elaine Stritch. The song is sometimes also known as "Bongo, Bongo, Bongo (I Don't Want to Leave the Congo)", from its first line of the chorus. The sheet music gives the title as "Civilization (Bongo, Bongo, Bongo)".

Content
The song is a satire of modern society sung from the perspective of a native person whose village is visited by a "civilized person" and other "civilized" people whom the native refers to as "educated savages". These visitors are trying to "civilize" the tribe. However, the native rejects them, and after listing the major flaws of civilization, ultimately decides that he will stay in Congo, where he lives.

Recordings
At least five recorded versions made the Billboard charts: by The Andrews Sisters and Danny Kaye, by Louis Prima, by "Smilin'" Jack Smith, by Ray McKinley, and by Woody Herman.

The Andrews Sisters and Danny Kaye recording was made September 27, 1947, and released by Decca Records as catalog number 23940. The record first reached the Billboard magazine charts on November 14, 1947, and lasted 10 weeks on the chart, peaking at No. 3. The Louis Prima recording made July 24, 1947, RCA Victor Records catalog number 20-2400, first reached the Billboard magazine charts on November 7, 1947, and lasted eight weeks, peaking at No. 8. The Jack Smith recording released by Capitol Records as catalog number 465 reached the Billboard magazine charts on December 26, 1947, and lasted two weeks on the chart, peaking at No. 14. The Ray McKinley recording, Majestic Records catalog number 7274, first reached the Billboard charts on December 26, 1947, at No. 14, lasting one week. The Woody Herman recording, Columbia Records catalog number 37885, reached the Billboard magazine charts the same week at No. 15, also lasting one week.

1947 charting versions

Note that all five versions were on the chart during the week of December 26, 1947.

Other versions
A recording by Joe Loss and his Orchestra with vocal by Elizabeth Batey was made in London on March 11, 1948. It was released by EMI on the His Master's Voice label BD 6007. Dyan Cannon performed the song on The Muppet Show along with several Muppet jungle animals.
Although Elaine Stritch sang it on Broadway, she did not record it until the 1977 album Make Mine Manhattan: Great Revues Revisited. It was included in her 2002 one woman stage show Elaine Stritch at Liberty. In 1967, a version of the song was included on Disneyland Records "Songs From 'The Jungle Book' And Other Jungle Favorites" (STER1304).

The song was translated into Finnish titled as "Bingo bango bongo" by Tapio Lahtinen. It was recorded by both Henry Theel and Olavi Virta in 1948. Lasse Mårtenson (1963), Hullujussi (1974), How Many Sisters (1983), and Lissun Baari (1997) have also released their versions in Finnish.

An Italian version translated by Alberto Curci was made popular in Italy sung by Nilla Pizzi and Luciano Benevene in 1947, and also sung by Sophia Loren in the 1954 movie Too Bad She's Bad. It was again brought to popularity in 1985 when Renzo Arbore used it in a popular TV show (Quelli della notte), and as a single release by comedy actor Christian De Sica in 1994.

Other appearances
 The 1950 Screen Songs animated short Jingle Jangle Jungle features a lion inviting the audience to sing along to the song to explain why he doesn't want to join a circus.
 "Civilization", performed by Danny Kaye and the Andrews Sisters, is featured on the in-game Galaxy News Radio in the 2008 video game Fallout 3, which takes place in a post-apocalyptic, retro-futurist United States in the year 2277 in the ruins of Washington D.C. The song is also included on Diamond City Radio in Fallout 4, the fifth major installment of the Fallout series, which takes place in the post-apocalyptic ruins of Boston in the year 2287, as well as in Fallout 76 on Appalachia Radio.
 Louis Prima's recording of "Civilization" is heard playing on the radio in Adrian Lyne's 1997 film Lolita.

References

1947 songs
Satirical songs
Protest songs
Songs about indigenous peoples
Songs with lyrics by Bob Hilliard
Songs written by Carl Sigman
Novelty songs
The Andrews Sisters songs
Works about missionaries